"Cutting Shapes" is a song by Dutch DJ Don Diablo. It was released on 7 October 2016 via Diablo's HEXAGON label.

Background 

The drop was described as "crunchy, wavy, bass-heavy and super energetic." As the song received many requests for an official release, Don said "I was literally getting so many requests to release the record that I decided to clear the sample and finish it off properly."

Track listing

Music Video 
The music video features Gabby J David dancing Cutting Shapes and Don Diablo performing various tasks in the background.

Charts

References 

2016 songs
2016 singles
Electronic songs
Don Diablo songs
Songs written by Don Diablo